Klouékanmè  is a town, arrondissement, and commune in the Kouffo Department of south-western Benin. The commune covers an area of 250 square kilometers and as of 2013 had a population of 128,537 people.

Locales within Klouékanmè Arrondissement include Adjanhonmè, Ahogbèya, Aya-Hohoué, Djotto, Hondji, Klouékanmè, Lanta, and Tchikpé.

References
 

Communes of Benin
Arrondissements of Benin
Populated places in the Kouffo Department